Peter Charles Lemon (born June 5, 1950) is a former United States Army soldier and a recipient of the United States military's highest award for valor, the Medal of Honor. He received the award for his actions on April 1, 1970, while serving in Tây Ninh Province during the Vietnam War. Lemon is the only Canadian-born United States citizen to be presented the medal for fighting in the Vietnam War. He is the eighth-youngest living Medal of Honor recipient.

Early life and education
Lemon was born in Toronto, Canada, on June 5, 1950. He is a 1968 graduate from the Tawas Area High School, Tawas City, Michigan. He volunteered to enter the United States Army at the East Tawas Post Office, East Tawas, Michigan. After his army service, he entered Colorado State University, graduating in 1979 with a degree in Speech. He received his Master's of Arts in Business Administration from the University of Northern Colorado two years later, and in 1998 he was proclaimed the university's "Humanitarian Alumni of the Year."

Career

Lemon is a motivational speaker, the author of the book Beyond the Medal, and executive producer of the PBS special Beyond the Medal of Honor. His book and documentary have been donated to every high school in the United States to inspire American children "to be worthy citizens."

Lemon has also run several corporations, including American Hospitality Association, Inc.; Darnell-Lemon, Inc.; and Probus, Inc.; as well as working as a semi-professional sculptor.

On May 1, 2009, Lemon was presented with the "Outstanding American by Choice" award by President Barack Obama at the White House, recognizing his life of professional achievement and civic contribution. This is the first time the award was presented by the President of the United States.

Lemon is an inductee in the elite Ranger Hall of Fame. A marble tribute honoring Lemon is present in Veteran's Park in Tawas City, Michigan.

Medal of Honor citation
Rank and organization: Sergeant, U.S. Army, Company E, 2d Battalion, 8th Cavalry, 1st Cavalry Division. Place and date: Tay Ninh province, Republic of Vietnam, April 1, 1970. Entered service at: Tawas City, Mich. Born: June 5, 1950, Toronto, Ontario, Canada.

Citation:

Awards and decorations
 Medal of Honor
 Bronze Star Medal with bronze Oak Leaf Cluster
 Air Medal with bronze Oak Leaf Cluster
 Army Commendation Medal
 Good Conduct Medal
 Purple Heart
 National Defense Service Medal
 Vietnam Service Medal
 Republic of Vietnam Gallantry Cross
 Republic of Vietnam Civil Actions Medal
 Republic of Vietnam Campaign Medal
 Combat Infantryman Badge
 Ranger Tab

See also

List of Medal of Honor recipients for the Vietnam War

References

External links

1950 births
Living people
United States Army Medal of Honor recipients
Canadian emigrants to the United States
Recipients of the Air Medal
United States Army soldiers
United States Army personnel of the Vietnam War
Canadian-born Medal of Honor recipients
Colorado State University alumni
People from Toronto
Vietnam War recipients of the Medal of Honor